That's So Weird is a Canadian sketch comedy television show produced by Halifax Film Company (later DHX Media Halifax), created by Jeff Copeland, broadcasts on YTV. The show has been described as SCTV or Mad TV for teenagers and includes an array of comedic skits. Reruns of the show currently airs on ABC Spark.

Premise
The show is a documentation of a group of teenagers who work at a fictional television station called So Weird TV. They receive various unusual products from their owner, Jamco, and are given the duty of creating commercial advertisements for the strange items. Alongside the ads they are required to do, So Weird TV also has programming that parodies television programs such as Degrassi: The Next Generation and This is Daniel Cook.

Characters
 Alana Johnston – The boss of the station, who, despite being a good friend, can be harsh.
 Kayla Lorette – A worker in the station. She is often criticized by Alana. In season 2 she develops a crush on James.
 James Hartnett – A worker in the station that develops a crush on Hannah, and is unaware that Kayla has a crush on him.
 Hannah Hogan – Has the highest popularity rating, and is often overconfident mostly for her own good. Her father also owns Jamco.
 Joey Lucius – A worker in the station who always manages to attract the attention of others.
 AJ Vaage – A worker in the station who often assists others.
 Alex Spencer – A worker in the station who has a relatively good relationship with everyone.

Production
Most scenes are filmed in front of live studio audiences. Season 1 was filmed in the former St. Francis of Assisi Catholic School building in Toronto. Later seasons were filmed in Halifax, Nova Scotia in Studio 1 at CBC Halifax.

Episodes

Season 1 (2009–2010)

Season 2 (2010–2011)

Season 3 (2011–2012)

Specials
 "That's So Scary!" – Put in an online version, and a televised version. Both have different sketches from each other. For example, the online version has the sketch "Ghost Chasers", while the televised version has "The Mom Whisperer" instead.

Minis
A series of four mini episodes were made, featuring sketches from the first and second seasons without any sitcom content. The theme song from the second season plays without any opening sketch.

Recurring sketches
 Every episode shows something going on with the team. In Season two, Kayla develops a crush on James who develops a crush on Hannah.
 "This is Daniel Book" – A parody of the TV show This is Daniel Cook, except this is Daniel Book who is nineteen years old instead of six years old, but acts as if he is six years old. Daniel has gone of various adventures, such as dating and snowboarding.
 "Talking with Logan and Wilf" – Two boys that are played by girls talk about various things.
 "Poptrendz" – A parody of entertainment news shows like etalk or Entertainment Tonight, Poptrendz is a show with various guest stars talking and doing adventures. Some of these are James meeting Eva, and interviews with Mario and Peach, Hogwarts Students, etc.
 "Raptoritis" – A boy is afflicted with a rare condition where loud noises cause him to act like a velociraptor.
 "Like a Doctor" – A man who thinks he's a doctor because he has seen every episode of Grey's Anatomy ever made.
 "Abby and Trevor" (unofficial name) – A series where Abby reads incredibly weird things out loud to Trevor, who has a crush on Abby. Unfortunately Trevor has a very hard time trying to clearly explaining his crush.
 Jamco commercials and their production – Appearing in most episodes where the gang receives a product from the fictional company Jamco and have to make a commercial for it. Products include "Extra-cise", "Combo-cise", "Chock-lick" and "Invisiball".

Awards and nominations

2011 Gemini Award Nomination

Best Children's or Youth Fiction Program or Series That's So Weird, Gary Pearson Michael Donovan, Charles Bishop

2011 Canadian Comedy Awards- 

Best Television Performance, Ensemble: James Hartnett, Hannah Hogan, Alana Johnston, Kayla Lorette, Joey Lucius, Alex Spencer, AJ Vaage (That's So Weird) (winner)

2013 – Canadian Screen Award Nominations. 

Best Children's or Youth Fiction Program or Series – That's So Weird! Gary Pearson, Michael Donovan, Charles Bishop

Best Writing in a Variety or Sketch Comedy Program or Series – That's So Weird! Mike Allison, Jan Caruana, James Hartnett, Alana Johnston, Jerry Schaefer, Gary Pearson, Duncan McKenzie

References

External links

 
 
 Halifax Film productions
 Inside Halton

2000s Canadian children's television series
2010s Canadian children's television series
2000s Canadian sketch comedy television series
2010s Canadian sketch comedy television series
2000s Canadian workplace comedy television series
2010s Canadian workplace comedy television series
2009 Canadian television series debuts
2012 Canadian television series endings
Canadian children's comedy television series
Children's sketch comedy
English-language television shows
Television series about teenagers
Television series by Corus Entertainment
Television series by DHX Media
Television shows filmed in Halifax, Nova Scotia
Television stations in fiction
YTV (Canadian TV channel) original programming